The toe loop jump is the simplest jump in the sport of figure skating. It was invented in the 1920s by American professional figure skater Bruce Mapes. The toe loop is accomplished with a forward approach on the inside edge of the blade; the skater then switches to a backward-facing position before their takeoff, which is accomplished from the skater's right back outside edge and left toepick. The jump is exited from the back outside edge of the same foot. It is often added to more difficult jumps during combinations and is the most common second jump performed in combinations. It is also the most commonly attempted jump.

History

The toe loop jump is the simplest of the six jumps in the sport of figure skating. It was invented in the 1920s by American professional figure skater Bruce Mapes, who might have also invented the flip jump. In competitions, the base value of a single toe loop is 0.40; the base value of a double toe loop is 1.30; the base value of a triple toe loop is 4.20; and the base value of a quadruple toe loop is 9.50.

Firsts

Technique
The toe loop is considered the simplest jump because not only do skaters use their toe-picks to execute it, their hips are already facing the direction in which they will rotate. The toe loop is the easier jump to add multiple rotations to because the toe-assisted takeoff adds power to the jump and because a skater can turn their body toward the assisting foot at takeoff, which slightly reduces the rotation needed in the air. It is often added to more difficult jumps during combinations and is the most common second jump performed in combinations. It is also the most commonly attempted jump, as well as "the most commonly cheated on take off jump", or a jump in which the first rotation starts on the ice rather than in the air. Adding a toe loop to combination jumps does not increase the difficulty of skaters' short or free skating programs.

According to figure skating researcher Deborah King and her colleagues, the toe loop jump can be divided into four key events and three phases. The key events are: the toe-pick, or the moment the skater places his or her toepick into the ice; the take-off, or the last contact the skater makes with the ice; the jump's maximum height; and the landing, or the moment the skater returns to the ice. The three phases are: the approach, which begins when the skater initiates the three turn entering into the jump and ends when they initiate the toe-pick; propulsion, which begins at the toe-pick and ends at take-off; and flight, which begins at take-off and ends at landing.

A skater initiates the toe loop with a forward approach on the inside edge of the blade, then switches to a backward-facing position before its takeoff, which is accomplished from the skater's right back outside edge and left toepick. The jump is exited from the back outside edge of the same foot. The skater approaches the right back outside edge of his or her skate from the landing of a previous jump when done in combination, from the right back outside edge from a right forward inside-to-right back outside three turn, or from a left forward outside-left back inside three turn followed by a change of foot. After completing the three turn, the skater reaches their free leg behind them and slightly outside the direction they are traveling, much like a pole-vaulter. Then they place the left toepick in the ice with the opposite foot they will use to make the landing, and jump while pulling the right leg back and around the left and reaching forward and around with the right arm and shoulder, thus achieving the rotation. They draw their arms into the body for the desired number of rotations. They should face forward, with their free leg approximately parallel to their take-off foot and with their arms as close to their body as possible, which results in keeping their arms and legs close to their bodies and remain in tight rotating positions at the moment of take-off, helping them attain faster rotational velocities in the air.

King and her colleagues, when they studied quadruple toe loop jumps at the 2002 Winter Olympics in Salt Lake City, Utah, counted 71 attempted quadruple toe loop jumps or quadruple toe-loop combination jumps. Of those, there were 33 quadruple toe loops performed not in combination with other jumps, 13 of which were landed cleanly, without a fall, without the skater touching a hand down on the ice, or without stepping out of the landing onto the other foot. They also found that "the most significant aspect" for completing toe loop jumps was the ability to increase rotational velocity while in the air. King also found that skaters who performed quadruple toe loops began to rotate their shoulders earlier than in triples, so that by the time they completed their toe-pick, their hips and shoulders were more aligned about their longitudinal axes. As a result, their hips and shoulders turned more uniformly during the propulsion phase of the jump. Vertical take-off velocity, however, was higher for both quadruple and triple toe loops, resulting in "higher jumps and more time in the air to complete the extra revolution for the quadruple toe-loop".

Footnotes

References

Works cited
 
 Kestnbaum, Ellyn (2003). Culture on Ice: Figure Skating and Cultural Meaning. Middletown, Connecticut: Wesleyan University Press. 
 King, Deborah; Smith, Sarah; Higginson, Brian; Muncasy, Barry; Scheirman, Gary (2004). "Characteristics of Triple and Quadruple Toe-Loops Performed during The Salt Lake City 2002 Winter Olympics" (PDF). Sports Biomechanics. 3 (1). Archived from the original on 6 January 2019. Retrieved 4 October 2022.

Figure skating elements
Jumping sports